Venanzo Crocetti (1913–2003) was an Italian sculptor. He was born in Giulianova, Abruzzo.

In 1938 Venanzo Crocetti received the Grand Prize in the 19th Venice Biennale. "The Door of the Sacraments" of the St. Peter's Basilica Crocetti finished in 1966. In 1972 he was nominated as president of the Accademia di San Luca.

Crocetti received the Golden Decoration from the Italian Ministry of Education for his achievement in fine art and culture.

Venanzo Crocetti Museum is a foundation in Rome dedicated to the work of the artist.

Notes

References
 Bühren, Ralf van: Kunst und Kirche im 20. Jahrhundert. Die Rezeption des Zweiten Vatikanischen Konzils (Konziliengeschichte, Reihe B: Untersuchungen). Paderborn: Ferdinand Schöningh 2008
 Paola Goretti: Venanzo Crocetti and the Sense of Atntiquity. Umberto Allemandi & C. 2013

External links 
Web gallery of 20th Century figure sculpture

1913 births
2003 deaths
People from the Province of Teramo
20th-century Italian sculptors
20th-century Italian male artists
Italian male sculptors
People from Giulianova